The Texas Court of Criminal Appeals (CCA) is the court of last resort for all criminal matters in Texas. The Court, which is based in the Supreme Court Building in Downtown Austin, is composed of a Presiding Judge and eight judges.

Article V of the Texas Constitution vests the judicial power of the state and describes the Court's jurisdiction and sets rules for judicial eligibility, elections, and vacancies.

Jurisdiction 
In Texas, the Court of Criminal Appeals has final jurisdiction over all criminal matters (excluding juvenile proceedings, which are considered civil matters), while the Texas Supreme Court is the last word on all civil matters.

The Court of Criminal Appeals exercises discretionary review over criminal cases, which means that it may choose whether or not to review a case.  The only cases that the Court must hear are those involving the sentencing of capital punishment or the denial of bail.

Court composition 

The Court is composed of a Presiding Judge and eight judges (unlike the Texas Supreme Court which is composed of a Chief Justice and eight Justices). Each judge serves a six-year term beginning January 1 and ending December 31, and the judges are elected in staggered partisan elections. Although all nine seats are elected at large, the Presiding Judge seat is separately designated from the other seats.

In order to be a judge, a person must be at least 35 years of age, a United States and Texas citizen, licensed to practice law in Texas, and must have practiced law for at least 10 years. A person 75 years or older cannot run for a seat on the Court of Criminal Appeals. Judges who turn 75 during the term of office may serve until December 31 of the fourth year of their term. The Governor of Texas, subject to Senate confirmation, may appoint a judge to serve out the remainder of any unexpired term until the next general election.

Current judges of the Texas Court of Criminal Appeals

Capital punishment 

According to a 2000 special article in the Chicago Tribune, from 1995 to 2000, records show that the court has granted new trials in capital cases eight times and new sentencing six times while affirming 270 capital convictions.

Selection of attorneys for indigent appellants

The appointment of attorneys for indigent defendants in capital cases is a source of controversy.  District Court judges appoint lawyers for trial and a defendant's initial appeal. Of the 131 inmates executed under Governor George W. Bush, 43 were represented by an attorney who at some point has been disbarred, suspended or otherwise sanctioned.

The appointment of attorneys for an inmate's final appeals, which allow attorneys to move beyond what occurred at trial and investigate for new evidence, has also proved troublesome. Attorneys at this stage can argue, for instance, that prosecutors improperly concealed evidence favorable to the defendant.

Before 1995, appellants were not guaranteed an attorney for final appeals.  In 1995, Texas revamped its system with a new law that collapsed the layers of appeal and set strict filing deadlines seeking to ensure that defendants received one full, fair set of appeals.  The state agreed to pay for court-appointed attorneys to handle the final appeals for Death Row inmates. The Court of Criminal Appeals got the job of making these appointments.  While assigning attorneys in about 300 cases, the Court of Criminal Appeals tapped some with questionable credentials or little experience.

For at least eight Death Row inmates, the court handpicked an attorney who previously had been sanctioned by the State Bar of Texas for misconduct, including one attorney who was still on probation. He was among four attorneys appointed by the court who had been disciplined more than once. In a ninth case, the attorney was sanctioned shortly after his appointment.  The misconduct ranged from relatively minor infractions to serious violations. They included failing to show up in court, lying to the State Bar of Texas or to a judge, and dismissing a client's legal claim without the client's permission or knowledge.

References

Further reading
Harnsberger, R. Scott. A Guide to Sources of Texas Criminal Justice Statistics [North Texas Crime and Criminal Justice Series, no.6]. Denton: University of North Texas Press, 2011.

External links

 Texas Court of Criminal Appeals

State supreme courts of the United States
Texas state courts
1841 establishments in the Republic of Texas
Courts and tribunals established in 1841